Kelce is a surname. Notable people with the surname include:

Jason Kelce (born 1987), American football player
Travis Kelce (born 1989), American football player